Blastobasis magna is a moth in the family Blastobasidae. It is found on the Channel Islands, in Italy, Portugal, Spain and on Sardinia and Sicily.

Taxonomy
The species was previously treated as a subspecies of Blastobasis roscidella.

References

External links
 Images representing Blastobasis magna  at Consortium for the Barcode of Life

Moths described in 1952
Blastobasis
Moths of Europe